Charles Carty Salmon (27 July 186015 September 1917) was an Australian politician who served as the second Speaker of the Australian House of Representatives, in office from 1909 to 1910. A doctor by profession, he began his political career in the Victorian Legislative Assembly before winning election to the House of Representatives at the inaugural 1901 federal election. He represented the Protectionist Party initially and then the Liberal Party, serving as Speaker for the duration of the Third Deakin Ministry. Salmon lost his seat in 1913, but returned to the House at a by-election in 1915. He died in office two years later.

Early life

Salmon was born at Amherst, Victoria on 27 July 1860 to English-born parents: storekeeper Frederick Browne Salmon and Susannah Carty, née Arnell, both English born. Charles Salmon prospered as a storekeeper and became a grazier in the Talbot district, and Susannah's brother was head of a tobacco importing and manufacturing company. After matriculating from Scotch College, Melbourne he worked briefly with both his father and his uncle, but not liking either employment he enrolled in medicine at the University of Melbourne in 1886, living at Trinity College. Here he learnt the arts of rowing and debating. After three years study in Melbourne he completed his medical training at the Edinburgh Medical School, making time for tours of England and the continent.

Carty Salmon, as he was commonly known, registered as a doctor in Melbourne in 1891, and entered practice at South Yarra. He was honorary surgeon for the South Yarra Relief Committee where he met Alfred Deakin, and the two men formed a lifelong friendship. The medical profession also proved not to be to his taste.

Colonial politics

Salmon won an 1893 by-election for the Victorian Legislative Assembly seat of Talbot and Avoca as an independent, His biographer writes that 'Immediately he abandoned medicine for politics and soon identified with the Deakinite liberal causes of anti-sweating legislation, a shorter working week and a high tariff' He was a minister without portfolio, and subsequently minister for public instruction and commissioner for trade and customs, in Allan McLean's government from 1899–1900.

Federal politics

In 1901, Salmon won election to the new Australian House of Representatives as the Protectionist member for Laanecoorie, holding the seat until its abolition at the 1913 election.  He was known for his support of the White Australia policy, a strong national defence (not including conscription), and the policy of New Protection.  He served as chairman of committees from 1904 to 1905.

In 1909, when the Protectionists amalgamated with the Anti-Socialists, Salmon became a member of the resulting "Fusion" Liberal Party. He was known as "an undistinguished but loyal personal follower" of Alfred Deakin, who began his third term as prime minister on 2 June. On 23 July, the incumbent speaker Sir Frederick Holder suffered a fatal cerebral haemorrhage while in the chamber. Salmon was elected as his successor on the same day, defeating Philip Fysh and Agar Wynne with the aid of Deakin's personal support.

Salmon's term as Speaker lasted less than a year, as the Labor Party won the 1910 federal election and elected one of its own members to the position, Charles McDonald. This remained the shortest tenure for a Speaker until Ian Sinclair's term of 180 days in 1998. Salmon attempted to transfer to the Senate in 1913 after his seat's abolition, but was defeated; he also declined preselection for the safe seat of Balaclava. In 1915, however, he won the seat of Grampians from Labor in a by-election and joined the Nationalist Party upon its formation in 1916.

Australian Natives' Association

Charles Carty Salmon joined the South Yarra branch of the Australian Natives' Association ANA in 1894, and was immediately elevated to the board of directors. He was elected Chief President in 1898.

Punch magazine commented cynically that Carty Salmon also aligned himself with the 'rising young men' in the House who were 'using the Australian Natives Association as a ladder to climb on'. He joined the association in 1894, and his 'pleasant drawing-room manner of speaking' soon made him 'a leading figure in the councils of the A.N.A.' Punch also noted that his election in 1898 as chief president of the ANA was 'great luck for Carty'. 'That year was the year of the referendum over Federation, and he was able to achieve a great reputation as a Federalist through the efforts of the association over which he presided'. A close examination of Carty Salmon's record as chief president does not disprove this judgement.

Marriage

In 1900 Carty Salmon married Nancy Anne Harris, whose father had been Mayor of Sydney. In 1901 Salmon moved into federal politics.

Freemason

Salmon was a freemason and from 1914 was the grand master of the Grand Lodge of Victoria. He was also a lieutenant-colonel in the Australian Army Medical Corps and commanded a base hospital in Melbourne in 1914. He died on 15 September 1917 at his home in South Yarra and was buried with Masonic rites and full military honours. His eulogy was delivered by Lowther Clarke, Archbishop of Melbourne, and both Prime Minister Billy Hughes and Leader of the Opposition Matthew Charlton attended his funeral.

References

 

1860 births
1917 deaths
Protectionist Party members of the Parliament of Australia
Commonwealth Liberal Party members of the Parliament of Australia
Nationalist Party of Australia members of the Parliament of Australia
Independent members of the Parliament of Victoria
Members of the Australian House of Representatives
Members of the Australian House of Representatives for Laanecoorie
Members of the Australian House of Representatives for Grampians
Members of the Victorian Legislative Assembly
Speakers of the Australian House of Representatives
People educated at Scotch College, Melbourne
Melbourne Medical School alumni
Alumni of the University of Edinburgh
Australian Freemasons
Masonic Grand Masters
20th-century Australian politicians
Australian medical doctors